The Reward Work Act of 2018 (S.2605 and HR 6096) is a proposed United States Act of Congress to ban unjustified stock buy-backs, and to require that every listed company enable employees to elect one-third of the board of directors. The Bill was sponsored initially by Senators Tammy Baldwin, Elizabeth Warren and Brian Schatz in March 2018, joined in April 2018 by Kirsten Gillibrand, and in November 2018 by Bernie Sanders. It was sponsored in the House of Representatives in June 2018 by Keith Ellison and Ro Khanna.

Contents
Section 2 prohibits stock buybacks on the open market.

Section 3 requires one-third board representation for employees of listed companies. Specifically, this amends §12b of the Securities Exchange Act of 1934 (15 USC 78l(b)(1)) to add "No issuer may register securities on a national exchange unless at least 1⁄3 of the issuer’s directors are chosen by the issuing company’s employees in a one-employee-one-vote election process." It then requires the Securities and Exchange Commission, consulting with the National Labor Relations Board to make regulations ensuring democratic election processes, and 1/3 of an issuer's board to "be composed of employee representatives within 2 years of the date of enactment of this Act."

Reception
The Act was welcomed by the Roosevelt Institute, and media outlets. 

A Civis poll found people in "the “lean Democrat” category voted 75% in favor of the question, and just 9% opposed. Around 43% of the “lean Republican” category supported the concept, while 31% opposed, and the pure Republican category saw 4% more opposed than in favor. But overall, a clear majority of people favor the concept."

See also
US labor law
European labour law
UK labour law
Codetermination
Workplace Democracy Act of 1999 introduced by Bernie Sanders
Accountable Capitalism Act

Notes

References
E Anzelotti, 'Want Fairer Workplaces? Give Employees Seats On The Board' (6 April 2018) Fast Company
D Matthews, 'Workers don’t have much say in corporations. Why not give them seats on the board?' (6 April 2018) Vox
E McGaughey, 'Votes at Work in Britain: Shareholder Monopolisation and the ‘Single Channel’' (2018) 15(1) Industrial Law Journal 76, map of countries on page 4
E McGaughey, 'The Codetermination Bargains: The History of German Corporate and Labour Law' (2016) 23(1) Columbia Journal of European Law 135 
E McGaughey, 'Democracy in America at Work: The History of Labor's Vote in Corporate Governance' (2019) 42 Seattle University Law Review
G Tyler, 'Codetermination Enters The American Political Debate' (20 April 2018) Social Europe

External links
S.2605, Text of proposed Reward Work Act

Proposed legislation of the 115th United States Congress
Labour law
United States labor law
United States proposed federal labor legislation